Marion Joseph (October 14, 1926 – 2022) was an American education reformer. She was adviser to the California state Superintendent of Public Instruction Wilson Riles. She advocated for a phonics based approach to reading instruction in California public schools.

References

20th-century births
2022 deaths
20th-century American women
21st-century American women
American educators
Educators from California